Jawak   is a village in Kohistanat District in Sar-e Pol Province, in northern Afghanistan. It was formerly in Jowzjan Province.

See also
 Sar-e Pol Province

References

Populated places in Sar-e Pol Province